Mordellistena bella is a beetle in the genus Mordellistena of the family Mordellidae. It was described in 1866 by Kirsch.

References

bella
Beetles described in 1866